Dennis Williams (born June 27, 1965) is an American former professional basketball player. He played for Hapoel Tel Aviv in the Israeli Premier League, and for FC Barcelona Banca Catalana in the Liga ACB and the EuroLeague. He was the top scorer in the 1993 Israel Basketball Premier League.

Biography
Williams was born in Charleston, South Carolina.

He played basketball for four seasons for the University of Georgia, averaging 8.9 points per game for the Bulldogs, graduating in 1987. Williams played guard, and in 1986-87 as he averaged 15.7 points per game he was 6th in the Southeastern Conference with 50 steals and 1.7 steals per game, and 10th with 192 field goals.

Williams was drafted in the 5th round of the 1987 NBA draft by the San Antonio Spurs.

Williams played two seasons (1987-89) for Hapoel Tel Aviv in the Israeli Premier League, averaging 23.6 points per game. He was the top scorer in the 1993 Israel Basketball Premier League.

He played for FC Barcelona Banca Catalana, which competes in the Liga ACB and the EuroLeague, in 1993-94, averaging 13.2 points per game. Williams also played parts of two seasons in the Continental Basketball Association (CBA) for three teams (Albany Patroons, Oklahoma City Cavalry and Yakima Sun Kings), averaging 13.2 points over 53 games.

References 

1965 births
Living people
Albany Patroons players
American expatriate basketball people in Israel
American expatriate basketball people in Spain
American men's basketball players
Basketball players from South Carolina
FC Barcelona Bàsquet players
Georgia Bulldogs basketball players
Hapoel Tel Aviv B.C. players
Oklahoma City Cavalry players
San Antonio Spurs draft picks
Shooting guards
Sportspeople from Charleston, South Carolina
Yakima Sun Kings players
American expatriate basketball people in the Philippines
Philippine Basketball Association imports
Shell Turbo Chargers players